The All Pueblo Council of Governors (formerly the All Indian Pueblo Council) is a non-profit  Puebloan leadership organization and political entity. They represent the 20 modern Pueblos across New Mexico and one in Texas on legislative, cultural and government issues. Some of the issues they fight for are the Pueblo Land Claims Act and the Indian Civil Rights Acts of 1968. They advocate for the sovereign rights of the Puebloan people and promote educational and economic advancement of the Pueblo nations. The council works to preserve the language, culture and traditions of the 20 pueblos.

The current chairman of the council is Wilfred Herrera, Jr. of Laguna Pueblo who replaced J. Michael Chavarria, of Santa Clara Pueblo.

Pueblos represented
Each pueblo has their own sovereign authority with which to govern their affairs.

New Mexico pueblos:
 Acoma Pueblo
 Cochiti Pueblo
 Isleta Pueblo
 Jemez Pueblo
 Laguna Pueblo
 Nambe Pueblo
 Ohkay Owingeh (San Juan Pueblo)
 Picuris Pueblo
 Pojoaque Pueblo
 San Felipe Pueblo
 San Ildefonso Pueblo
 Sandia Pueblo
 Santa Ana Pueblo
 Santa Clara Pueblo
 Santo Domingo Pueblo
 Taos Pueblo
 Tesuque Pueblo
 Zia Pueblo
 Zuni Pueblo

Texas Pueblo: 
 Ysleta del Sur Pueblo

See also
 Indian Pueblo Cultural Center

References

Non-profit organizations based in New Mexico
Advocacy groups in the United States